David Wardrope Wallace (December 22, 1850 – November 19, 1924) was an Ontario physician and political figure. He represented Russell in the House of Commons of Canada as a Liberal member from 1903 to 1904.

He was born in North Gower, Canada West in 1850, the son of James Wallace and Agnes Adams, and studied at Queen's University, receiving his M.D. there. Wallace married Esther Eastman in 1883. He was elected to the House of Commons in a 1903 by-election held after William C. Edwards was named to the Senate. Wallace died in Ottawa at the age of 73.

References 

1850 births
1924 deaths
Liberal Party of Canada MPs
Members of the House of Commons of Canada from Ontario